Jan Švankmajer (born 4 September 1934) is a Czech filmmaker and artist whose work spans several media. He is a self-labeled surrealist known for his stop-motion animations and features, which have greatly influenced other artists such as Terry Gilliam, the Brothers Quay, and many others.

Life and career

Early life 
Švankmajer was born in Prague. An early influence on his later artistic development was a puppet theatre he was given for Christmas as a child. He studied at the College of Applied Arts in Prague and later in the Department of Puppetry at the Prague Academy of Performing Arts, where he befriended Juraj Herz. He contributed to Emil Radok's film Johanes doctor Faust in 1958 and then began working for Prague's Semafor Theatre where he founded the Theatre of Masks. He then moved on to the Laterna Magika multimedia theatre, where he renewed his association with Radok.

As a filmmaker
This theatrical experience is reflected in Švankmajer's first film The Last Trick, which was released in 1964. Under the influence of theoretician Vratislav Effenberger, Švankmajer moved from the mannerism of his early work to classic surrealism, first manifested in his film The Garden (1968), and joined the Czechoslovak Surrealist Group.

Švankmajer has gained a reputation over several decades for his distinctive use of stop-motion technique, and his ability to make surreal, nightmarish, and yet somehow funny pictures. Švankmajer's trademarks include very exaggerated sounds, often creating a very strange effect in all eating scenes. He often uses fast-motion sequences when people walk or interact. His movies often involve inanimate objects being brought to "life" through stop motion. Many of his films also include clay objects in stop motion, otherwise known as claymation. Food is a common subject and medium. Švankmajer also uses pixilation in many of his films, including Food (1992) and Conspirators of Pleasure (1996).

Stop-motion features in most of his work, though his feature films have included much more live-action sequences than animation.

Many of his movies, like the short film Down to the Cellar, are made from a child's perspective, while at the same time often having a truly disturbing and even aggressive nature. In 1972 the communist authorities banned him from making films, and many of his later films were suppressed. He was almost unknown in the West until the early 1980s. Writing in The New York Times, Andrew Johnston praised Švankmajer's artistry, stating "while his films are rife with cultural and scientific allusions, his unusual imagery possesses an accessibility that feels anchored in the shared language of the subconscious, making his films equally rewarding to the culturally hyperliterate and to those who simply enjoy visual stimulation."

Among his best known works are the feature films Alice (1988), Faust (1994), Conspirators of Pleasure (1996), Little Otik (2000) and Lunacy (2005), a surreal comic horror based on two works of Edgar Allan Poe and the life of Marquis de Sade. The two stories by Poe, "The System of Doctor Tarr and Professor Fether" and "The Premature Burial", provide Lunacy its thematic focus, whereas the life of Marquis de Sade provides the film's blasphemy. His short film Dimensions of Dialogue (1982) was selected by Terry Gilliam as one of the ten best animated films of all time. His films have been called "as emotionally haunting as Kafka's stories." In 2010 he released Surviving Life, a live-action and cutout animation story about a married man who meets another woman in his dreams.

His most recent release is called Insects (Hmyz). It had a projected budget of 40 million CZK, which was partially funded through an Indiegogo campaign which reached more than double its goal, and was released in January 2018. The film is based on the play Pictures from the Insects' Life by Josef and Karel Čapek, which Švankmajer describes as following: "From the Life of Insects is a misanthropic play. My screenplay only extends this misanthropy, as man is more like an insect and this civilisation is more like an anthill. One should also remember the message in Kafka’s Metamorphosis."

His life's works, inimitable style and voice have had far-reaching influences on the world of animation. Those whose work he has influenced include Brothers Quay, Caroline Leaf, Vera Neubauer, Terry Gilliam, Tomasz Bagiński, Nina Gantz and Phil Lord and Christopher Miller among many others. 

He won the Golden Bear for Best Short Film at the Berlin International Film Festival in 1983 for Dimensions of Dialogue. 

In 2000, Švankmajer received Lifetime Achievement Award at the World Festival of Animated Film - Animafest Zagreb.

On 27 July 2013 he received the Innovation & Creativity Prize by Circolino dei Films, an independent Italian cultural organization.

On 10 July 2014, he received the 2014 FIAF Award during a special ceremony of the Karlovy Vary International Film Festival.

On 27 September 2018, he received the Raymond Roussel Society Medal in recognition of his extraordinary contribution: an inspiring, unique and universal work.

He was married to Eva Švankmajerová, an internationally known surrealist painter, ceramicist, and writer until her death in October 2005. Švankmajerová collaborated on several of her husband's movies, including Alice, Faust, and Otesánek. They had two children, Veronika (b. 1963) and Václav (b. 1975, an animator).

Filmography

Feature-length films

Short films

Animation and art direction

Bibliography 
 Peter Hames, Dark Alchemy: The Films of Jan Švankmajer. Westport: Praeger Publishers, 1995 

 
Bertrand Schmitt, František Dryje, Švankmajer, Dimensions of dialogue. Between Film and Fine Art. Prague: Arbor Vitae, 2012

See also 
 Jiří Trnka, Czech animator and puppeteer
 Karel Zeman, Czech animator and filmmaker
 Jiří Barta, Czech stop motion animator
 Ladislaw Starewich, Polish animator and puppeteer
 The Torchbearer, a film by Jan Švankmajer´s son, Václav
 List of stop motion films

References

Further reading

External links

 
 The Animation of Jan Svankmajer at Keyframe - the Animation Resource
 Overview of his work
 Jan Švankmajer - PL 
 On Svankmajer's Faust
 The Works of Jan Svankmajer
 Downing the Folk-Festive: Menacing Meals in the Films of Jan Svankmajer
 Czech Animation, private blog
 An article and filmography on Svankmajer
 Review of Dimensions of Dialogue, The Ossuary, Food and Death of Stalinism

 
1934 births
Living people
Film directors from Prague
Czech animators
Czechoslovak film directors
Czech animated film directors
Czech surrealist artists
Czech experimental filmmakers
Czech culture
Stop motion animators
Clay animators
Surrealist filmmakers
Horror film directors
Artists from Prague
Sun in a Net Awards winners